The United Nations Office in Armenia is the permanent representation of the United Nations in Armenia. Its headquarters are located in Armenia's capital, Yerevan.

History 

Armenia joined the United Nations on 2 March 1992, and in December 1992 the United Nations established an office in Yerevan. The UN Office in Armenia is led by the Resident Coordinator, who coordinates all UN operations at the country level. There are 20 resident and non-resident agencies conducting operations in Armenia including the Food and Agriculture Organization, International Labour Organization, International Organization for Migration, United Nations Industrial Development Organization, UNESCO, World Health Organization, among others. The World Bank, International Finance Corporation, and International Monetary Fund also maintain offices in the country.

Functions 
The UN Office in Armenia works closely with the Government of Armenia to support the country in achieving key sustainable development goals and national development priorities. The UN and the Armenian government work together in partnership with broader stakeholders including with civil society, academia, parliament, the private sector and other development partners. Some of the key goals within the "Armenia Transformation Strategy 2050" include promoting the well-being of people, developing an inclusive green economy, advancing good governance and democratic reforms, supporting gender equality, eliminating poverty and hunger, improving water quality and sanitation, developing the economy, and reducing inequalities.

The UN Office also assists with supporting the most immediate humanitarian needs of people displaced from in and around Nagorno-Karabakh and the affected communities in Armenia following the 2020 Nagorno-Karabakh war.

Resident Coordinator  
UN Resident Coordinator's to Armenia:
  Lila Pieters Yahia (2021–present)
  Shombi Sharp (2018–2021)
 Bradley Busetto (2012–2018)
 Dafina Gercheva (2010–2012)

See also 
 Foreign relations of Armenia
 List of current Permanent Representatives to the United Nations
 List of diplomatic missions in Armenia
 Permanent Mission of Armenia to the United Nations
 United Nations Security Council Resolution 735

References

External links 
 Official site
 United Nations in Armenia on Facebook

United Nations
United Nations
1992 establishments in Armenia
Armenia and the United Nations